Kenneth D. Cole (born March 23, 1954) is an American designer, social activist, and visionary who believes business and philanthropy are interdependent. His global company, Kenneth Cole Productions, creates modern, functional, and versatile footwear, clothing, and accessories for inspirational urban lifestyles under the labels Kenneth Cole New York, Reaction Kenneth Cole, and Unlisted, as well as footwear under the label Gentle Souls.

Early life and education 
Born to a Jewish family in Brooklyn, New York, his father, Charles Cole, owned the El Greco shoe manufacturing company. Cole graduated from John L. Miller Great Neck North High School in 1972. Before learning the family business and starting his own company in 1982, Cole graduated from Emory College of Arts and Sciences of Emory University in 1976.

Birth of a shoe company 
Kenneth Cole Productions, Inc. is an American fashion house founded in 1982 by Kenneth Cole. Wanting to preview his line of shoes at the New York Shoe Expo at the New York Hilton, but unable to afford the purchase of a hotel room or showroom to display his items, Kenneth Cole inquired about parking a trailer two blocks from the Hilton Hotel. Upon discovering that permits for trailers were only granted to utility and production companies, Cole changed the name of his company from Kenneth Cole Incorporated to Kenneth Cole Productions, and applied for a permit to film the full-length film, "The Birth of a Shoe Company". In two and a half days, Kenneth Cole Productions sold forty thousand pairs of shoes, while chronicling the beginning of the company on film.

In 1994, Kenneth Cole went public, and has been included on Forbes annual list of 200 Best Small Companies four times.

Kenneth Cole Productions sells clothing and accessories under the following labels: Kenneth Cole New York, Kenneth Cole Reaction, Unlisted and Gentle Souls. The company’s products are also distributed through department stores, better specialty stores, company-owned retail stores and its e-commerce website and digital global flagship, www.kennethcole.com.

The company has a wide variety of strategic partnerships for the production of men’s apparel, fragrances, watches, jewelry, eyewear, and several other categories.

Almost 40 years ago, Kenneth Cole leveraged his passion and unique brand platform to make a meaningful impact on people’s wardrobes, as well as communities in need. Today, the company remains committed to helping communities in need by supporting public health, civil liberties and sustainability.

Support of progressive social causes 
Since 1985, Kenneth Cole has been openly involved in publicly supporting AIDS awareness and research. He is considered the first in the fashion industry to do so.  He uses fashion as a medium to promote socially conscious ads to help fight various issues, from AIDS to homelessness. He has donated proceeds to such organizations as Mentoring USA, amfAR and Rock the Vote. Since 2005, Cole has served as chairman for amfAR. In November 2017, sixty people including prominent AIDS activists signed a demand that Cole step down from his position after a federal investigation for fraud and money laundering was opened. In February 2018, Cole stepped down as Chairman after serving more than 30 years on amfAR's board and 14 years as Chairman, amid the controversial Harvey Weinstein deal.

In 2001, The Kenneth Cole Foundation, in association with Cole's alma mater, Emory University, created The Kenneth Cole Fellows in Community Building and Social Change Program at Emory University.

Kenneth Cole's socially conscious advertising for the causes that he champions can be somewhat controversial. One such example was his campaign for World AIDS Day in 2005. He designed T-shirts for the campaign which were sold at such stores as Barneys New York, Scoop, and Louis Boston. The messages on the shirts stated either, "We All Have AIDS" or "I Have AIDS." Cole created the shirts in hopes that those with or without AIDS would wear the shirts, to help diminish the stigma attached to the disease. Cole stated, "There is a legend of the Danish king, Christian X, who, during World War II, when Hitler insisted all Jews publicly wear a yellow Star of David, would wear the star himself, hence making it difficult to differentiate who was Jewish. This is kind of like that, hopefully."

In August 2006, it was announced that Kenneth Cole Productions would stop selling fur in all of their garments for the Fall 2007 Fashion Season.

In October 2007, Cole guest-starred in the Ugly Betty episode Betty's Wait Problem.

In the summer of 2007, Kenneth Cole Productions also began their "Awearness" Campaign, which will produce a line of T-shirts to benefit the charities that the company supports, and proceeds will go to the Awearness Fund. The campaign is further promoted by a book "Awearness: Inspiring Stories About How to Make a Difference" featuring celebrities assisting various causes.

On May 1, 2009, Kenneth Cole delivered Northeastern University's keynote address at the Commencement ceremony.

In 2020, Kenneth Cole founded the Mental Health Coalition, a group of the most passionate and influential organizations, brands, and individual who have joined forces to end the stigma surrounding mental health and to change the way people talk about, and care for, mental illness.

Awards
In 1998, People Magazine voted Cole as "Sexiest Businessman of the Year."

On May 14, 2009, The Legal Aid Society of New York City honored Kenneth Cole with its inaugural Theodore Roosevelt Corporate Award at the Waldorf Astoria during its Servant of Justice Award Dinner. Proceeds will go to benefit struggling New Yorkers who live in poverty. 

In November 2011, Cole was honored by the Ride of Fame and a double decker tour bus was dedicated to him in New York City.

In 2016, Cole received the UNAIDS International Goodwill Ambassador award.

In 2017, Cole received the CFDA Swarovski Award for Positive Change.

In 2011 and 2019, Footwear News named Cole Icon for Social Impact.

In 2020, Cole received Person of the Year Award from the American Apparel and Footwear Association as well as the Visionary Change Maker Award from the American Foundation for Suicide Prevention Child Mind.

In 2022, Cole received the Suicide Prevention Champion Award from the American Foundation for Suicide Prevention Child Mind.

Controversy 

On February 3, 2011, Kenneth Cole posted an update on Twitter that referenced the 2011 Egyptian protests. The tweet, which indicated that Cole himself wrote the entry, said: "Millions are in uproar in #Cairo. Rumor is they heard our new spring collection is now available online at (website address) -KC". After outrage and much parody on the microblogging site and on the web in general, Cole deleted the entry and posted a personal apology on Facebook.

In April 2012, the designer started a campaign portraying the national debate over education as one that pits "Teachers’ Rights vs. Students' Rights". On the West Side Highway southbound entering New York City, a billboard punned to southbound commuters, ”Shouldn’t Everyone Be Well Red?” On Salon, David Sirota wrote:
"Cole’s campaign is thinly veiled ideological propaganda, and it comes with myriad problems, not the least of which is the simple fact that almost nobody believes “underperforming teachers” should be protected. That includes the nation’s biggest teachers’ unions, which have been outspoken in backing “accountability” reforms for teacher tenure. So right off the bat, Cole is constructing a straw man, one that has served over the years to pretend that public employee unions in general and teachers’ unions specifically are about nothing more than making sure bad employees get to keep their jobs."

In response to the negative outcry, his company announced on Twitter, "We misrepresented the issue—one too complex for a billboard—and are taking it down."

Personal life 

In 1986, Cole met Maria Cuomo, and they married a year later. Maria Cuomo Cole is the daughter of former New York Governor Mario Cuomo and sister of former New York State Governor Andrew Cuomo and former CNN journalist Chris Cuomo. One of his daughters, Amanda, hosted the Mets Kids Clubhouse for SportsNet New York cable TV network.

Cole and his wife Maria purchased a $14.5 million co-op in 2008 on Sutton Place in New York City. At one time, fashion designer Bill Blass lived in this same building. As of 2018, he and his wife reside on an 11.35 acre estate in Purchase, NY. Together they have three daughters: Emily, Amanda and Catie.

Books 
 Cole, Kenneth, Footnotes: What You Stand for is More Important Than what You Stand in, New York: Simon and Schuster (September 30, 2003)
 Cole, Kenneth, Awearness: Inspiring Stories about How to Make a Difference, New York : DK Melcher Media (November 3, 2008). 
 Cole, Kenneth, This Is A Kenneth Cole Production, New York: Rizzoli (September 25, 2013)

References

Bibliography
 

1954 births
Living people
20th-century American Jews
American fashion designers
Jewish fashion designers
Emory University alumni
American fashion businesspeople
Cuomo family
People from Brooklyn
Great Neck North High School alumni
21st-century American Jews